Narchat, Narchatka, Naricha  was a Moksha Queen, ruler of Moxel mentioned in Russian sources as Murunza. She was daughter and successor of king Puresh and sister of Atämaz. She led the uprising against Mongols in 1242 and was slain in Battle of Sernya in 1242.

Mongol Takeover 
In September 1237 the Mongols invaded Kingdom Moxel ('Moksha Kingdom' in Latin sources). They seized the capital Noronshasht and killed all the city dwellers. Narchat's father and brother together with Moxel army joined the Mongol hordes on their way to Europe. As soon as she found out her father, brother and many Moksha warriors were killed in Germany she attacked the Mongol convoys passing Mokshaland. On their way from Europe, Mongols returned to Moxel and seized Sernya. The city was burnt down, all the defenders were killed. Queen Narchat with a small group of warriors broke out of the burning fortress but Mongols chased her. Her men were slain and she jumped into the ice-hole in river Moksha and drowned together with her horse.

Historical Personality
Russian professor from Penza State Pedagogical University Vitaliy Lebedev wrote:  Doctor of Sciences Dmitriy Madurov of Chuvash state Institute of Humanities writes:  Indeed, it is known the Burtas had been ruled by elders.

Narchat in coinage 

Ethnographer Vladimir Aunovsky wrote that he encountered coins with Narchatka portrait in traditional Moksha woman's headdress and they say: "This is our queen". These coins are called mordovkas in slang, or silver coins type A as they are described by Bogdan Zaikovsky with inscription in Moksha language in Greek Uncial script  ( 'goes only for half Oka (gold coin name)') and might be dated as 4-8th century AD. Triangle coins, pre-Mongolian silver Valfs, 22x23 mm size, with a depiction of a woman in a headdress» are described by Vyacheslav Zavaryukhin as he specifies they should be referred to as Mukhsha coinage according to the Christian Frähn's list.

Narchat in Epic Tales

See also
 Battle of Legnica
 Mongol invasion of Rus'
 Mongol invasion of Europe
 History of Middle Volga Area

Literature
Masztorava, Erza és moksa népköltészeti anyag feldolgozásával írta Alekszandr Markovics Saronov, Budapest, 2010
Лебедев В. И. Нарчатка / Пензенская энциклопедия. М.: Научное издательство «Большая Российская энциклопедия», 2001, с. 376
Алихова А. Е., М. Ф. Жиганов, П. Д. Степанов. Из древней и средневековой истории мордовского народа. Саранск, 1959.
Пудалов Б. М., Начальный период истории древнейших городов Среднего Поволжья. (XII ѕ первая треть XIII в.) Нижний Новгород, 2003
Фомин В. В., Пургасова Русь. Институт Российской истории РАН, 2007.
Устно-поэтическое творчество мордовского народа в 12 томах, Саранск, 1963-2003
Мордовская мифология/ Энциклопедия. Саранск, 2013

References

Sources 

13th-century births
1242 deaths
Queens regnant in Asia
13th-century soldiers
Military strategists
13th-century rulers in Europe
Moksha people
13th-century women rulers